Saedani Al-Hashimy (Arabic: سعيداني الهاشمي) is a writer, translator and journalist born in 1948 in the town of Djerma, 20 km from the city of Batna in eastern Algeria. He died in 2005.

Education 
He started his early education in regular schools and then moved on to a rich cultural path, where he learned about the basic roots of Arab literary and scientific literature.

Career 

His career path was distinguished by the diversity of jobs, as he worked in education, practiced translation and journalism. Then he was assigned to the media at the level of the state of Batna before he took over the administration of the House of Culture for 14 years, during which he was able to make it a destination for intellectuals and creators, including university students, playwrights, painters, writers and journalists. Before returning to his original position as a chief administrative assistant in one of the departments of the state headquarters of Batna.

Al-Hashimy is one of the most prominent campaigners for the continued broadcasting of Radio Batna after independence. He is a founding member of the Eurasia Folk Song Festival, as well as one of the founders of the Timgad International Festival, which has become a pride for Algeria.

His good mastery of the Arabic and French languages has earned him a unique style of writing and social analysis. He has been a solid advocate of democratic, modern and republican values. And striving for the authentic Amazigh culture and seeking to promote it.

List of his works 
Al-Hashimy left our world, leaving behind a rich cultural heritage through his works that he embodied in various literary genres, from novel to story, through theater and biography. Among his books:

Awards 

 Recipient of the late Boudiaf Award, for his book The child's crook (Arabic: eawaj altifl) in 1993.

Reverences 

Algerian novelists
Algerian Arab nationalists
1948 births
2005 deaths